Łukaszewo may refer to the following places:
Łukaszewo, Greater Poland Voivodeship (west-central Poland)
Łukaszewo, Golub-Dobrzyń County in Kuyavian-Pomeranian Voivodeship (north-central Poland)
Łukaszewo, Inowrocław County in Kuyavian-Pomeranian Voivodeship (north-central Poland)